The 2020 Puerto Rico Senate election was held on November 3, 2020, to elect the members of the 27th Senate of Puerto Rico, concurrently with the election of the Governor, the Resident Commissioner, the House of Representatives, and the mayors of the 78 municipalities. The winners will be elected to a four-year term from January 2, 2021, to January 2, 2025.

The New Progressive Party lost their two-thirds super-majority, but the Popular Democratic Party failed to win the 14 seats needed for a majority. The Puerto Rican Independence Party and Independent senator Vargas Vidot retained their seats, while the Citizen's Victory Movement and Project Dignity gained 2 and 1 seats respectively. José Luis Dalmau (PPD) was elected Senate President on January 2.

Summary 
There are 88 candidates running for senator:

 New Progressive Party (PNP) have 22 candidates, 15 of which are incumbent.
 Popular Democratic Party (PPD) have 22 candidates, 2 of which are incumbent.
 Puerto Rican Independence Party (PIP) have 19 candidates.
 Citizen's Victory Movement (MVC) have 19 candidates.
 Project Dignity (PD) have 5 candidates.
 1 candidate is independent, 1 of which is incumbent.

Senate Composition

26th Senate of Puerto Rico (2017-2021)

27th Senate of Puerto Rico (2021-2025)

Results

Summary 

|-
|colspan=15 align=center|
|- style="background-color:#E9E9E9"
! rowspan="2" colspan="2" style="text-align:center;" | Parties
! style="text-align:center;" colspan="3" | District
! style="text-align:center;" colspan="3" | At-large
! rowspan="2" style="text-align:center;" colspan="1" | Total seats
! rowspan="2" style="text-align:center;" colspan="1" | Composition
! rowspan="2" style="text-align:center;" colspan="1" | ±%
|- style="background-color:#E9E9E9"
! style="text-align:center;" | Votes
! style="text-align:center;" | %
! style="text-align:center;" | Seats
! style="text-align:center;" | Votes
! style="text-align:center;" | %
! style="text-align:center;" | Seats
|- style="text-align:right;"
| bgcolor=#cc0033|
| style="text-align:left;" | Popular Democratic Party (PPD)
| 797,203
| 36.50%
| 10
| 377,195
| 31.21%
| 2
| 12
| 
| 9
|- style="text-align:right;"
| bgcolor=#0000cc width=3 |
| style="text-align:left;" | New Progressive Party (PNP)
| 814,941
| 37.32%
| 6
| 402,774
| 33.33%
| 4
| 10
| 
|12
|- style="text-align:right;"
| bgcolor=#CFB53B |
| style="text-align:left;" | Citizen's Victory Movement (MVC)
| 315,931
| 14.46%
| 0
| 133,069
| 11.01%
| 2
| 2
| 
| 2
|- style="text-align:right;"
| bgcolor=#33cc66 |
| style="text-align:left;" | Puerto Rican Independence Party (PIP)
| 198,093
| 9.07%
| 0
| 136,679
| 11.32%
| 1
| 1
| 
| 1
|- style="text-align:right;"
| bgcolor=#00B7EB |
| style="text-align:left;" | Project Dignity (PD)
| 57,465
| 2.63%
| 0
| 88,716
| 7.35%
| 1
| 1
| 
| 1
|- style="text-align:right;"
| bgcolor=#DDDDDD |
| style="text-align:left;" | Independents
| 0
| 0%
| 0
| 69,810
| 5.78%
| 1
| 1
| 
| 1
|- style="background-color=#0000cc;text-align:right;"
|-
|align=left colspan=2|Total
| 2,183,633
| 100.0
| 16
| 1,208,243
| 100.0
| 11
| 27
|
|
|}

Senator At-Large 

Every party has a seat in the senate, making it the first time since 2004 that all parties are represented. María de Lourdes Santiago placed 1st for the second time (1st being 2012) and won a third non-consecutive term; Joanne Rodríguez Veve came in 2nd place, while Senate President Thomas Rivera Schatz came in 4th place, losing 3.74% of the vote relative to his last performance.

Senator by District

I San Juan

II Bayamón

III Arecibo

IV Mayagüez-Aguadilla

V Ponce

VI Guayama

VII Humacao

VIII Carolina

Notes

References 

Senate
Puerto Rico Senate